Gholam Cham (also Romanized as Gholām Cham) is a village in Darram Rural District, in the Central District of Tarom County, Zanjan Province, Iran. At the 2006 census, its population was 84, in 22 families.

References 

Populated places in Tarom County